Irmgard Ilse Ida Grese (7 October 1923 – 13 December 1945) was a Nazi concentration camp guard at Ravensbrück and Auschwitz, and served as warden of the women's section of Bergen-Belsen. She was a volunteer member of the SS.

Grese was convicted of crimes involving the ill-treatment and murder of prisoners committed at Auschwitz and Bergen-Belsen concentration camps, and sentenced to death at the Belsen trial. Executed at 22 years of age, Grese was the youngest woman to die judicially under British law in the 20th century. Auschwitz inmates nicknamed her the "Hyena of Auschwitz".

Early life and family
Irmgard Ilse Ida Grese was born to Berta Grese and Alfred Grese, both dairy workers, on 7 October 1923. Irma was the third of five children (three girls and two boys). In 1936, her mother died by suicide after drinking hydrochloric acid following the discovery of Alfred’s affair with a local pub owner's daughter. Historian Peter Vronsky speculated that Alfred Grese joined the Nazi Party in 1937 and remarried in 1939.

Irma's sister Helene said at Irma's trial that in primary school, when "girls were quarreling and fighting, [Irma] never had the courage to fight, but ... ran away." In 1938, at the age of 15, Grese left school. She worked on a farm for six months, then in a shop, then at a hospital run by the SS for two years.

Concentration camp guard
By her teenage years, Grese, like her sisters, wanted to join the League of German Girls (Bund Deutscher Mädel), the branch of the Hitler Youth for girls, but her father forbade it. Before her 17th birthday, she moved to the SS Female Helpers' training base, which was located near Ravensbrück, the all-female concentration camp.

In 1940, she became an Aufseherin (guard or overseer) at Ravensbrück, and transferred to Auschwitz-Birkenau in March 1943. Due to her transfer, Grese had a falling out with her father the same year, as he had been vehemently opposed to her joining the SS-Gefolge. He expelled her from his house.

Grese participated in prisoner selections for the gas chambers at Auschwitz. 

In early 1945, Grese accompanied a prisoner evacuation transport from Auschwitz to Ravensbrück. In March, she went to Bergen-Belsen, along with a large number of prisoners from Ravensbrück. Grese was captured by the British Army on 17 April 1945, with other SS personnel who did not flee.

War crimes trial

Grese was among the 45 people accused of war crimes at the Belsen Trial which was held in Lüneburg, Lower Saxony. She was tried over the first period of the trials (17 September – 17 November 1945) and was represented by Major L. Cranfield. The trials were conducted under British military law, based on charges derived from the Geneva Convention of 1929 regarding the treatment of prisoners. The accusations against her centred on her ill-treatment and murder of those imprisoned at the camps. 

Survivors provided detailed testimony of cruelties; they also claimed that she beat some women using a plaited whip. Under direct examination, Irma Grese testified about her background:
I was born on 7 October 1923. In 1938 I left the elementary school and worked for six months on agricultural jobs at a farm, after which I worked in a shop in Lychen for six months. When I was 15 I went to a hospital in Hohenlychen, where I stayed for two years. I tried to become a nurse but the Labor Exchange would not allow that and sent me to work in a dairy in Fürstenberg. In July 1942, I tried again to become a nurse, but the Labour Exchange sent me to Ravensbrück Concentration Camp, although I protested against it. I stayed there until March 1943, when I went to Birkenau Camp in Auschwitz. I remained in Auschwitz until January 1945.

During the trial, the press labelled Grese as "the Beautiful Beast" alongside former SS-Hauptsturmführer Josef Kramer ("the Beast of Belsen"), the former commandant at Birkenau. After a nine-week trial, Grese was sentenced to death by hanging. Although the charges against some of the other female warders (a total of 16 were charged) were as serious as those against Grese, she was one of only three female guards to be sentenced to death.

Execution
Grese and two other concentration camp workers, Johanna Bormann and Elisabeth Volkenrath, were convicted, along with eight men, for crimes committed at Auschwitz and Belsen, and sentenced to death. As the verdicts were read, Grese was the only prisoner to remain defiant. Her subsequent appeal was rejected.

According to Wendy Adele-Marie Sarti, the night before her execution, Grese sang Nazi songs until the early hours of the morning with Johanna Bormann. On 13 December 1945, in Hamelin Prison, Grese was led to the gallows. The women were executed individually by long-drop hanging and then the men in pairs. British Army Regimental Sergeant-Major Richard Anthony O'Neill assisted the executioner, Albert Pierrepoint:We climbed the stairs to the cells where the condemned were waiting. A German officer at the door leading to the corridor flung open the door and we filed past the row of faces and into the execution chamber. The officers stood at attention. Brigadier Paton-Walsh stood with his wristwatch raised. He gave me the signal, and a sigh of released breath was audible in the chamber, I walked into the corridor. 'Irma Grese', I called. The German guards quickly closed all grilles on twelve of the inspection holes and opened one door. Irma Grese stepped out. The cell was far too small for me to go inside, and I had to pinion her in the corridor. 'Follow me,' I said in English, and O'Neil [sic] repeated the order in German. At 9.34 a.m. she walked into the execution chamber, gazed for a moment at the officials standing round it, then walked on to the centre of the trap, where I had made a chalk mark. She stood on this mark very firmly, and, as I placed the white cap over her head, she said in her languid voice, Schnell. [English translation: 'Quickly']. 

The drop crashed down, and the doctor followed me into the pit and pronounced her dead. After twenty minutes the body was taken down and placed in a coffin ready for burial.

Dramatizations
Grese has been portrayed as a minor character in two films: Pierrepoint (2005), which portrays her execution following the Belsen war crimes trial; and Out of the Ashes (2003). Both films feature additional female guards in much smaller roles. Grese was briefly portrayed in a nonspeaking reenactment in Auschwitz: The Nazis and the 'Final Solution' (2005).

See also
 Female guards in Nazi concentration camps
 Therese Brandl
 Ilse Koch
 Maria Mandl

References

External links

 The Justified Execution of Irma Grese or The Beast of Belsen, video at YouTube
 The Belsen Trial, Law-Reports of Trials of War Criminals, The United Nations War Crimes Commission, Volume II, London, HMSO, 1947; retrieved 22 December 2006.
 SS-Frauen am Galgen, max.mmvi.de; retrieved 22 December 2006.
 Irma Grese, Capital Punishment U.K., retrieved on 6 December 2009.
 Irma Grese, Auschwitz.dk, retrieved on 22 December 2006.
 Auschwitz: Inside The Nazi State; Corruption: Episode 4, PBS.org; retrieved 22 December 2006.
 Excerpts from The Belsen Trial - Part 5 of 5: Testimony of and concerning Irma Grese ,The Nizkor Project; retrieved 22 December 2006.

1923 births
1945 deaths
Auschwitz concentration camp personnel
Belsen trial executions
Executed German women
Female guards in Nazi concentration camps
Executed people from Mecklenburg-Western Pomerania
People from Mecklenburgische Seenplatte (district)
People from the Free State of Mecklenburg-Strelitz
Ravensbrück concentration camp personnel
Holocaust perpetrators in Poland
Executed mass murderers